The Roman Catholic Archdiocese of Visakhapatnam/Vizag/Vishakhapatnam is an archdiocese located in the city of Visakhapatnam in India.

History
 16 March 1845: Established as the Apostolic Pro-Vicariate of Vizagapatam from the Apostolic Vicariate of Madras
 3 April 1850: Promoted as Apostolic Vicariate of Vizagapatam
 1 September 1886: Promoted as Diocese of Vizagapatam
 21 October 1950: Renamed as Diocese of Visakhapatnam
 16 October 2001: Promoted as Metropolitan Archdiocese of Visakhapatnam

Claretian Missionary Fathers(CMF) entered the diocese in the year 1888.
In 1845 Rome entrusted to the MSFS a vast area of Eastern and Central India with the headquarters at Visakhapatnam. The first group of MSFS landed on the East coast of India on 8 September 1845.
The order of Friars Minor Capuchins. A Novitiate was opened in India in 1922 thus planting the order in the Indian soil.(Chinna Waltair)
Society of Jesus(K.D. Peta)
Congregation of the Missions (C.M) Vincentians (Ukkunagaram)

Leadership
 Archbishops of Visakhapatnam (Latin Rite)
 Archbishop Prakash Mallavarapu; Archbishop; formerly Bishop of the Roman Catholic Diocese of Vijayawada, India
 Archbishop Kagithapu Mariadas, M.S.F.S. (16 October 2001 – 3 July 2012); retired
 Bishops of Visakhapatnam (Latin Rite) 
 Bishop Kagithapu Mariadas, M.S.F.S. (later Archbishop) (10 September 1982 – 16 October 2001)
 Bishop Ignatius Gopu, M.S.F.S. (4 October 1966 – 2 August 1981)
 Bishop Joseph-Alphonse Baud, M.S.F.S. (21 October 1950 – 4 October 1966)
 Bishops of Vizagapatam (Latin Rite) 
 Bishop Joseph-Alphonse Baud, M.S.F.S. (23 March 1947 – 21 October 1950)
 Bishop Pierre Rossillon, M.S.F.S. (18 June 1926 – 22 March 1947)
 Bishop Jean-Marie Clerc, M.S.F.S. (19 February 1891 – 18 June 1926)
 Bishop Jean Marie Tissot, M.S.F.S. (1 September 1886 – 1890)
 Vicars Apostolic
 Bishop Jean Marie Tissot, M.S.F.S. (1862 – 1 September 1886)
 Bishop Theophile Sebastian Neyret, M.S.F.S. (3 April 1850–5 Nov 1862)
 Pro-Vicars Apostolic
 Fr. Theophile Sebastian Neyret, M.S.F.S. (1847 – 3 April 1850)
 Fr. Jacques Henri Gailhot, (16 March 1845 – 1847)

Suffragan dioceses
 Eluru 
 Guntur
 Nellore
 Srikakulam
 Vijayawada

References

Sources
 GCatholic.org 
 Catholic Hierarchy 
 Official Website of the Archdiocese of Visakhapatnam

Roman Catholic dioceses in India
Religious organizations established in 1850
Roman Catholic dioceses and prelatures established in the 19th century
Christianity in Andhra Pradesh
1850 establishments in India